The Hadâmbu Monastery is a Romanian Orthodox monastery located in Schitu Hadâmbului, Iași County, Romania.

Left in ruin for many years, the monastery was reopened in 1990.

The monastery is listed in the National Register of Historic Monuments.

References

External links

 The official website 

Historic monuments in Iași County
Romanian Orthodox monasteries of Iași County
Christian monasteries established in the 17th century
1659 establishments in Romania
17th-century architecture in Romania